The Muskingum Electric Railroad was a private coal-carrying railroad owned by American Electric Power, and started operation in 1968.  MERR shuttled coal in two trains from the mine to a powerplant at Relief, Ohio (across from Beverly, OH), a distance of 20 miles (32 km). The trains were driverless and powered by automated General Electric E50C's. The road also owned two private cars, Dover Fort and Oak Lane. The line is now defunct as the captive coal mine has since run out of economically recoverable coal. The coal was harvested by the largest dragline ever to be built, "Big Muskie". The railroad closed in January 2002.

The line was the first automated railroad in the U.S.

References

External links
Elwood's Fallen Flags Page for MERR
Big Muskie Dragline fan page

Defunct Ohio railroads
Electric railways in Ohio
Railway companies established in 1968
Railway companies disestablished in 2002
1968 establishments in Ohio
American Electric Power
Mining railways in the United States
Transportation in Washington County, Ohio
Coal mining in the United States